Fabio Zúñiga (born June 11, 1981) is a former American soccer player who played for New England Revolution in the MLS.

Career statistics

Club

Notes

References

1981 births
Living people
American soccer players
Association football forwards
New England Revolution players
MLS Pro-40 players
Connecticut Wolves players
Major League Soccer players
A-League (1995–2004) players